Santa Rita Union School District is located in Salinas, California, USA. The district consists of Gavilan View Middle School (grades 6–8), Juan Gutierrez Middle School (grades 6–8), La Joya Elementary School (K-5), Santa Rita Elementary School (K-5), McKinnon Elementary School (K-5), and New Republic Elementary School (K-5).  The district office is currently located in front of Gavilan View Middle School on Russell Road.  The district office used to be located about a half mile away in a smaller building.  In the 90s, the building that houses the current district office was built and subsequently the district office moved.

References

External links

School districts in Monterey County, California
Education in Salinas, California